WSOS may refer to:

WSOS (AM), a radio station (1170 AM) licensed to St. Augustine Beach, Florida, United States
WSOS-FM, a radio station (94.1 FM) licensed to Fruit Cove, Florida, United States